Csaba Szantó is a Hungarian sprint canoeist who competed in the late 1960s. He won a bronze medal in the C-2 1000 m event at the 1966 ICF Canoe Sprint World Championships in East Berlin.

References

Hungarian male canoeists
Living people
Year of birth missing (living people)
ICF Canoe Sprint World Championships medalists in Canadian
20th-century Hungarian people